The Oil Refinery Jey or the Oil Refining Company Jey has been established in 2003; with the investment of Oil Industry Personnel Pension Fund, with a nominal capacity of 1'800'000 tons as the largest producer of bituminous units in the Middle East. The company has two production and storage sites in Isfahan and Bandar Abbas and the head office in Tehran. Isfahan site has 4 separate units for the production of blown bitumen, with a nominal capacity of 40,000 barrels per day, a bottoms of 7100 barrels per day and emulsion bitumen with a capacity of 200 tons per day. This site is a separate unit for the production of polymeric and modified bitumen with a capacity of 100'000 tons annually. G-Petroleum Laboratory is the most well-equipped industrial bitumen laboratory in the country and region, and has been recognized as the first International Accreditation Lab with 17025 Standard Certificate since 2007; The laboratory as a supplier of testing the results for various types of bitumen and associates of different inspection companies, which are including of SGS and Atlas in the region and also in the Bandar Abbas import and export terminals for various delivery services, all were launched in 1395 (2015). The complex consists of 8 tank units with a capacity of 3000 tons (total storage capacity of 24,000 tons), is designed, manufactured and operated on the basis of the international standards of ASTM , IPS, API and NFPA20.

In order to establish an Integrated Management System (IMS), complying with the environmental requirements and quality of production, the company succeeded in obtaining ISO / IEC17025 certificates by 2012, ISO9001 to 2008, ISO / TS29001 to 2010, ISO14001 to 2004, ISO10015 to year 1999, BS-OHSAS18001 to 2007, and Iran's standardized ISIRI.

See also 

 Industry of Iran
 Privatization in Iran
 List of Iranian companies
 National Iranian Oil Company
 Industry of Iran
 Privatization in Iran
 List of Iranian companies
 National Iranian Oil Company
 Isfahan Oil Refinery
 Pasargad Oil Company

References

External links 
 http://www.oipf.ir/
 Official Website of the Jey Oil Company
 http://new.tse.ir/news/newsPages/news_N39848.html
 http://www.lubricants1.com/news/lubricant-news/january-2010/item-7599.html
 http://companies.globalmarket.com/pars-oil-co-246893.html 

Oil and gas companies of Iran
Isfahan
Manufacturing companies based in Tehran
Companies listed on the Tehran Stock Exchange
Iranian brands